Libre may refer to:

Computing
 Libre software, free software
 Libre Computer Project, developer of open-hardware single-board computers

Medicine
FreeStyle Libre, a glucose monitoring device

Music
 Libre (Alejandra Guzmán album)
 Libre (Jennifer Peña album)
 Libre (Marc Anthony album)
 Libre, album by Nino Bravo, includes its namesake song
 "Libre" (Nino Bravo song)
 Libre (Sébastien Izambard album)
 "Libre" (Álvaro Soler song)
 Libre.fm, a music community website

Other uses
 Libre (Guatemala), a defunct progressive political party
 Libre (Honduras) or Liberty and Refoundation, a left-wing political party
 Libre (word)
 French frigate Libre (1796)
 Libre (publisher), a Japanese publisher

See also	
 Vers libre
 LibreOffice, free and open source office suite
 Enciclopedia Libre Universal en Español
 Libra (disambiguation)
 Liber (disambiguation)
 Libres (disambiguation)
 
 
 Livre (disambiguation)